Ottoman Yemen may refer to:

 Yemen Eyalet (1517–1872), an eyalet (top-level province) of the Ottoman Empire, roughly encompassing modern Yemen
 Yemen Vilayet (1872–1918), its name after a land reform that changed eyalets into vilayets